Nancy Varian Berberick (born 1951) is an American fantasy author well known for her work in the Dragonlance series.

Biography
Her Wizards of the Coast biography mentions that she is fond of going through a thesaurus. She enjoys Beowulf, Norse mythology, and Orlando Innamorato.

She has written 12 fantasy novels, eight of which have been in the Dragonlance saga, and numerous short stories.

Bibliography

Dragonlance

Novels

Short stories

Non-Dragonlance

References

External links
 
 
 

1951 births
20th-century American novelists
20th-century American short story writers
20th-century American women writers
21st-century American novelists
21st-century American short story writers
21st-century American women writers
American fantasy writers
American women novelists
American women short story writers
Living people
Women science fiction and fantasy writers